Tiberiu Harasztosi is a male former international table tennis player from Romania.

He won a bronze medal at the 1956 World Table Tennis Championships in the Swaythling Cup (men's team event) with Toma Reiter, Matei Gantner, Paul Pesch and Mircea Popescu for Romania. 

He also won two bronze medals in the 1958 European Championships.

See also
 List of table tennis players
 List of World Table Tennis Championships medalists

References

Romanian male table tennis players
World Table Tennis Championships medalists
Year of birth missing (living people)
Living people
Place of birth missing (living people)